MK Preshow Shimray is an Indian politician from Manipur. He was elected as the MLA 45 - Chingai (ST) Assembly Constituency in Manipur in the 2012 Manipur Legislative Assembly election as an Indian National Congress candidate. He joined Bharatiya Janata Party In July 2020.

Early life
MK Preshow Shimray was born on April 5, 1966 at Poi village to MK Somi Shimray. He did his B.E and M.E (Environment) at Salem Engineering College, Tamil Nadu. After completing his education, he worked as a Scientific Officer and thereafter as a Senior Scientific Officer in the Environment and Ecology Department, Manipur.

Political career
In 2012, he resigned from his engagement as a senior scientific officer in order to contest the MLA election under the Congress ticket. He got elected beating his nearest rival with a simple majority vote. In July 2013, MK Preshow Shimray was elected as the Deputy Speaker of the Manipur Legislative Assembly with a term till 2017.

Assassination bids
On April 30, 2013, the cavalcade of the deputy speaker was ambushed near Ukhrul by suspected NSCN (IM) cadres. However, no loss of life took place. Police claim that a bomb was detonated after the cavalcade passed leading to a 30 minute long firefight between the security forces and the splinter group. 

Another assassination attempt took place on April 10, 2014, where an IED was exploded by rebels followed by a firefight as Shimray was returning to Imphal after voting in Chingai. No member of Shinmay's cavalcade was injured, and security forces were unable to capture the assailants.

Anti tribal bills protests
In October 2015, the Tangkhul Naga Long, a Tangkhul rights organization demanded 3 Tangkhul Congress MLAs resign as they did not voice enough opposition to three ‘anti-tribal Bills’ passed on August 31. Shinmay did not follow the demand.

References

1966 births
Living people
Manipur politicians
Indian National Congress politicians
People from Ukhrul district